Cbp/p300-interacting transactivator 1 is a protein that in humans is encoded by the CITED1 gene.

Interactions
CITED1 has been shown to interact with HSPA8 and EP300.

References

External links

Further reading